Braunston Tunnel is on the Grand Union Canal about 830 yds (760 m) east of Braunston, Northamptonshire, England top lock. It is in the northern outskirts of Daventry, about 2 km east of the village of Braunston.

Braunston Tunnel is 2,042 yards (1,867 m) in length.  Built by Jessop and Barnes, the tunnel has no towpath and is 4.8m wide by 3.76m high.

It was opened in 1796. Its construction was delayed by soil movement and it was probably the resulting movement that led to the tunnel having a slight 'S' bend. There is room for two 7 ft (2.13 m) beam boats to pass. There are three air shafts along its length.

The tunnel passes underground alongside another Grand Union Canal feature, Drayton Reservoir, from which the feeder enters the canal at the east end of the tunnel.

Features

See also

Legging (canals)
List of canal tunnels in the United Kingdom

References

External links

Canals in Northamptonshire
Canal tunnels in England
Tunnels in Northamptonshire
Tunnels completed in 1796
1796 establishments in England